Sanborn may refer to:

Places in the United States
Sanborn, California
Sanborn, Iowa 
Sanborn, Minnesota 
Sanborn, Nebraska 
Sanborn, New York 
Sanborn, North Dakota 
Sanborn, Ashland County, Wisconsin, a town
Sanborn (community), Wisconsin, an unincorporated community
Sanborn County, South Dakota 
Sanborn Township, Michigan
Lake Sanborn, a lake in Minnesota

Other uses
Sanborn (surname)
Sanborn maps, maps of U.S. cities and towns in the 19th and 20th centuries, published by The Sanborn Map Company
Grupo Sanborns, a large restaurant chain in Mexico, owned by business magnate Carlos Slim Helú

See also